Merrion Square is a Georgian garden square on the southside of Dublin city centre.

History 
The square was laid out in 1752 by the estate of Viscount FitzWilliam and was largely complete by the beginning of the 19th century. The demand for such Georgian townhouse residences south of the River Liffey had been fuelled by the decision of the then Earl of Kildare (later the Duke of Leinster) to build his Dublin home on the then undeveloped southside. He constructed the largest aristocratic residence in Dublin, Leinster House, second only to Dublin Castle. As a result of this construction, three new residential squares appeared on the Southside: Merrion Square (facing the garden front of Leinster House), St Stephen's Green, and the smallest and last to be built, Fitzwilliam Square.

Aristocrats, bishops and the wealthy sold their northside townhouses and migrated to the new southside developments.

Legacy 

All the original 18th century properties in Merrion Square have survived to the present day except for Antrim House which was demolished to make way for the National Maternity Hospital in the 1930s. Three sides are lined with Georgian redbrick townhouses; the West side abuts the grounds of Leinster House (seat of the Oireachtas), Government Buildings, the Natural History Museum and the National Gallery. The central railed-off garden is now a public park.

The Wellington Testimonial to commemorate the victories of Arthur Wellesley, 1st Duke of Wellington, was originally planned to be located in Merrion Square. However it was built in the Phoenix Park after opposition from the square's residents.

Occupancy

Until about the 1950s, the houses in the square were largely residential, but today most of them are used for office accommodation. The Irish Red Cross, the Royal Institute of the Architects of Ireland and the Irish Georgian Society have their headquarters on the square. The National Maternity Hospital is on the North terrace. 
 
The poet, novelist, and satirist Oscar Wilde lived at No. 1, poet W. B. Yeats lived at No. 82, and Daniel O'Connell at No. 58, the latter of which is now known as the O'Connell House, home to the Keough Naughton Centre of the University of Notre Dame, an American college.  The fashion and interior designer Sybil Connolly lived at No. 71.  A number of houses in the square have plaques with historical information on former notable residents, including A.E. (George William Russell) and Sheridan Le Fanu. Despite the square being largely occupied by commercial entities, there are still several residents, including fashion designer Louise Kennedy and tycoon Dermot Desmond.

Until 1972 the British Embassy was based at No 39. However, following the Bloody Sunday shootings in Northern Ireland, a crowd of over 20,000 people converged on the site in protest and the building was burnt to the ground. Currently, the Embassies of France, Korea and Slovakia are based on the south side of the square and the Church of Scientology's National Affairs Office has been housed at No 4 on the north side since October 2016.

Park

The earliest plan of the park shows a double line of trees around the perimeter which was later enclosed by railings in the early years of the 19th century. A Jardin Anglaise approach was adopted for the layout of the park with contoured grass areas, informal tree clumps, sunken curved paths and perimeter planting.

Up until 1974 the park was only open to residents in possession of a private key.
Now managed by Dublin City Council, the park contains a statue of Oscar Wilde, who resided in No. 1, Merrion Square from 1855 to 1876, many other sculptures and a collection of old Dublin lamp standards. Irish-American sculptor Jerome Connor, best known for his work "Nuns of the Battlefield" in Washington D.C., designed the public art piece, "Eire". The park also contains a sculpture of a Joker's Chair in memory of Father Ted star Dermot Morgan.

The park in the square was called "Archbishop Ryan Park", after Dermot Ryan, the Catholic archbishop who transferred ownership to the city. In 2009, Dermot Ryan was criticised in the Murphy Report; in January 2010, Dublin City Council sought public views on renaming the Park. In September 2010, the City Council voted to rename the park as Merrion Square Park.

The park was also used by the St John Ambulance Brigade for annual events such as review and first aid competitions. The organisation was founded in 1903 by Sir John Lumsden K.B.E., M.D. During this time Dr Lumsden was living nearby at 4 Fitzwilliam Place. He was the chief medical officer at the Guinness brewery and practised at Mercer's Hospital.

During the First World War, both St. John Ambulance and the British Red Cross Society worked together in a joint effort as part of the war effort. This ensured services did not overlap with each other. Both organisations were a familiar sight among Irish people but particularly at Merrion Square where St. John Ambulance operated for almost 50 years. The headquarters of St. John Ambulance was situated at 40 Merrion Square during WWI later moving to 14 Merrion Square. Today they are located at Lumsden House, 29 Upper Leeson Street, Dublin 4 (see St John Ambulance archive for further info).

Notable residents 

Merrion Square was a fashionable address for politicians, lawyers, doctors and writers.Notable residents include;

 The Rev'd Gilbert Austin (1753–1837) – Educator, clergyman and author
 The Very Reverend Henry Montague Browne (1799–1884) – Dean of Lismore of The Church of Ireland
 Sybil Connolly (1921–1998) – Fashion & Interior Designer
 Sir Dominic Corrigan (1802–1880) – Physician
 Sir Philip Crampton (1777–1858) – Surgeon
 Dermot Desmond (born 1950) – Irish financier
 Richard FitzWilliam, 7th Viscount FitzWilliam (1745–1816) – Irish peer and musical antiquarian
 Willliam Fletcher (1750–1823) – judge and politician 
 John Leslie Foster (1781–1842) – Barrister, judge and MP
 Edward Gibson, 1st Baron Ashbourne (1837–1913) – Lawyer and Lord Chancellor of Ireland 
 Violet Gibson (1876–1956) – daughter of Edward Gibson, 1st Baron Ashbourne; attempted assassin of Benito Mussolini
 Henry Grattan (1746–1820) – Politician and MP
 Robert James Graves (1796–1853) – Surgeon
 Charles Hemphill, 1st Baron Hemphill (1822–1908) – Politician and barrister
 L. Ron Hubbard (1911–1986) – Founder of the Church of Scientology
 Louise Kennedy (born 1960) – Irish fashion designer
 George Knox (1765–1827) – Politician and MP
 Valentine Lawless, 2nd Baron Cloncurry (1773–1853) – Politician and landowner
 Sheridan Le Fanu (1814–1873) – Writer
 Robert Dyer Lyons (1826–1886) – Physician and MP
 Sir Henry Marsh (1790–1860) – Surgeon
 Richard Bolton McCausland (1810–1900) – Surgeon
 John Henry North (1788–1831) – Barrister, judge and MP 
 Daniel O'Connell (1775–1847) – Politician and MP
 Edward Pennefather (1774–1847) – Judge
 Richard Pennefather (1773–1859) – Judge
 David Richard Pigot (1796–1873) – Judge
 Sir Andrew Porter (1837–1919) – Judge
 George William Russell (1867–1935) – Poet and painter
 John Stratford, 1st Earl of Aldborough (1698–1777) –  Irish Peer and MP
 Whitley Stokes (1830–1909) – Lawyer and Celtic scholar
 William Stokes Snr (1804–1878) – Physician
 William Stokes Jnr (1838–1900) – Surgeon
 John Lighton Synge (1897–1995) – Physicist 
 Oscar Wilde (1854–1900) – Writer and poet
 Sir William Wilde (1815–1876) – Writer and surgeon
 W. B. Yeats (1865–1939) – Poet, playwright and Senator

See also

Sir William Napier, 3rd Baronet
List of streets and squares in Dublin

References
Citations

Sources

External links

 Archiseek.com Doorways Archiseek.com Doorways

Art gallery districts
Squares in Dublin (city)
Streets in Dublin (city)
Georgian architecture in Ireland
Parks in Dublin (city)